Oxford FA may refer to:
Oxfordshire County Football Association
Oxford University Football Association